Dillianne van den Boogaard (born 9 August 1974, in Veghel) is a former Dutch field hockey defender, who played 174 international matches for the Netherlands, in which she scored 68 goals.

External links
 
 Dutch Hockey Federation

1974 births
Living people
Dutch female field hockey players
Olympic field hockey players of the Netherlands
Field hockey players at the 1996 Summer Olympics
Field hockey players at the 2000 Summer Olympics
Olympic bronze medalists for the Netherlands
People from Veghel
Olympic medalists in field hockey
Medalists at the 1996 Summer Olympics
Medalists at the 2000 Summer Olympics
HC Den Bosch players
Sportspeople from North Brabant